Alucita rhymotoma is a moth of the family Alucitidae. It is found in India (Kanara).

References

Moths described in 1921
Alucitidae
Moths of Asia
Taxa named by Edward Meyrick